Miyares is one of 24 parishes (administrative divisions) in Piloña, a municipality within the province and autonomous community of Asturias, in northern Spain.  Miyares Parish includes three places: Miyares, La Goleta and Vallobal . In the place of Miyares are Cerezaleu neighborhoods, Oak Grove, Barbillosu, El Cantil, The Palace, mud, Fazona, El Pando and La Cabañina.

The population is 221 (INE 2007).

Villages and hamlets
 La Goleta 
 Miyares 
 El Cantil 
 El Corral 
 El Palacio
 El Pando

References 

Parishes in Piloña